Gazipur Khan High School and College is a secondary school located at Bara Gazipur, Titas Upazila, Comilla District, Bangladesh. It was established in 1963.

References

Schools in Comilla District
High schools in Bangladesh
1963 establishments in East Pakistan
Educational institutions established in 1963